A lexical function (LF) is a tool developed within Meaning-Text Theory for the description and systematization of semantic relationships, specifically collocations and lexical derivation, between particular lexical units (LUs) of a language. LFs are also used in the construction of technical lexica (Explanatory Combinatorial Dictionaries) and as abstract nodes in certain types of syntactic representation. Basically, an LF is a function ƒ( ) representing a correspondence ƒ that associates a set ƒ(L) of lexical expressions with an LU L; in f(L), L is the keyword of ƒ, and ƒ(L) = {L´i} is ƒ’s value. Detailed discussions of Lexical Functions are found in Žolkovskij & Mel’čuk 1967, Mel’čuk 1974, 1996, 1998, 2003, 2007, and Wanner (ed.) 1996; analysis of the most frequent type of lexical functions—verb-noun collocations—can be found in Gelbukh & Kolesnikova 2013.

Standard Lexical Functions
Standard LFs form a proper subset of normal LFs. A normal LF ƒ is called Standard if and only if it satisfies both following conditions:

1. Broadness of the domain of ƒ: ƒ is defined for a relatively large number of keywords;
2. Diversity of the range of ƒ: ƒ has a relatively large number of expressions as elements of its possible values and these expressions are more or less equitably distributed between different keywords.

Normal LFs that do not satisfy both Conditions 1 and 2, on the one hand, and degenerate LFs, on the other, are called Non-Standard.
An example of a Non-Standard LF is the meaning ‘without addition of dairy product’. It has two expressions in English, a phraseological one—BLACK (with COFFEE: black coffee), and a free one—WITHOUT MILK (tea without milk is not *black tea). This meaning fails Condition 1: it is too specific and applicable only to  one beverage. It thus corresponds to a Non-Standard LF.

Simple Standard LFs
1. Syn [Lat. synonymum] = synonym.
 Syn(helicopter) = copter, chopper
 Syn(telephoneV) = phoneV
2. Anti [Lat. antonymum] = antonym.
3. Convijk [Lat. conversivum] = conversive. 
This LF returns for L an LU L´ with the same meaning as L but with its Deep Syntactic Actants (roughly, syntactic arguments) i, j and k permuted —for example, the DSyntAs k, i and j of L are permuted in L´ such that [i→k, j→i, and k→j].
 Conv21(include) = belong
 Conv231⊃(opinion) = reputation
 Conv21(behind) = in front of
 Conv21(precede) = follow
4. Gener [Lat. genus] = the closest generic concept for L. 
The value of this LF must appear in one of the following two constructions:
1) ‘Gener(L)−ATTR→DER(L)’ = ‘L’ [where DER is any DSynt-derivative, see 6–9 below]; or
2) L, X1, X2, ..., Xn and other (kinds of) Gener(L).
 Gener(republic) = state [republican state = republic]
 Gener(liquidN) = substance [liquidA substance = liquidN]
 Gener(arrestN) = reprisals [arrests and other (kinds of) reprisals]
5. Figur [Lat. figuraliter ‘figuratively’] = standard received metaphor for L. 
 Figur(fog) = wall [wall of fog ≈ fog]
 Figur(rain) = curtain [curtain of rain ≈ rain]
 Figur(remorse) = pangs [pangs of remorse ≈ remorse]
6. S0 = Substantival, output N having a congruent meaning to L (which can be of any part of speech except N):
 S0(analyze) = analysis
7. A0 = Adjectival, output A having a congruent meaning to L (which can be of any part of speech except A):
 A0(city) = urban
8. V0 = Verbal, output V having a congruent meaning to L (which can be of any part of speech except V):
 V0(analysis) = analyze
9. Adv0 = Adverbial, output Adv having a congruent meaning to L (which can be of any part of speech except Adv):
 Adv0(followV [N]) = after [N]
10. Si = standard name of the i-th (Deep-Syntactic) actant of L.
For the verb TEACH: ‘Person X1 teaches subject Y2 to people Z3’
 S1(teach) = teacher
 S2(teach) = subject/matter [in high school]
 S3(teach) = pupil	
For the noun LETTER: ‘Letter by person X to person Y about Z’
 S1(letter) = author, sender [of the letter]
 S2(letter) = addressee [of the letter]
 S3(letter) = contents [of the letter]
11. Sinstr = standard name of the instrument used in the situation denoted by L. 
 Sinstr⊃(shoot) = firearm
 Sinstr(murderV,N) = murder weapon
12. Smed = standard name of the means used to bring about the situation denoted by L. 
 Smed⊃(shoot) = ammunition
13. Smod = standard name of the mode through which the situation denoted by L is realized. 
 Smod(consider [an issue]) = approach [I consider this issue  ... ~ My approach to this issue ...]
14. Sloc = standard name of the location where the situation denoted by L is realized. 
 Sloc(fightV [two armies]) = battlefield
 Sloc(war) = theater (of war)
15. Sres = standard name of the result of the situation denoted by L.
 Sres⊃(learn) = knowledge, skills
 Sres⊃(explosion) = shockwave
 Sres⊃(copyV) = copyN, reproduction
16. Ablei [Lat. habilis ‘able, manageable’] = determining property of the i-th potential DSyntA of L (‘such that it can L easily’/‘such that it can be L-ed easily’):
 Able1(cryV) = tearful
 Able1(vary) = variable
 Able2(prove) = provable
 Able2(trustV) = trustworthy
17. Quali [Lat. qualitas] = determining property of the i-th probable DSynt-actant of L (‘such that it is predisposed to L’/‘such that it is predisposed to be L-ed’):
 Qual1(cryV/N) = sad
 Qual1(laughV/N) = cheerful
 Qual2(doubtV/N) = implausible
 Qual2(laughV/N) = awkward, absurd
18. Ai = determining property of the i-th DSyntA of L from the viewpoint of its role in the situation ‘L’. 
A1 is semantically roughly equivalent to an active participle (≈ ‘which is L-ing’), and A2 to a passive participle (≈ ‘which is being L-ed’):
 A1(anger) = in [anger] //angry
 A1(speed) = with [a speed of ...]	
 A2(analyze) = //under analysis
 A2(conduct [an orchestra])= //under the baton [of N]
19. Advi = the determining property of the action by the i-th DSyntA of L from the viewpoint of the role of the DSyntAi of L in the situation denoted by L. 
Adv1 is semantically roughly equivalent to an active verbal adverb (≈ ‘while L-ing’), and Adv2, to a passive verbal adverb (≈ ‘while being L-ed’):
 Adv1(anger) = with [~] //angrily
 Adv1(decreaseN,V) = //down [… a decrease of 2.7% = ... down 2.7%.]	
 Adv2(applause) = to [the ~]		
 Adv2(bombard) = //under bombardment [They came under heavy bombardment.]
20. Imper [Lat. imperāre ‘[to] command’] = imperative expression meaning ‘do L!’
 Imper(shoot) = Fire!
 Imper(speak low) = Shhh!
 Imper(stop [to a horse]) = Whoa!
21. Result [Lat. resultāre ‘[to] result’] = ‘[to] be the expected result of L’:
 Result(buyV) = ownV	
 Result(lie down) = be lying
 Result(have learnt) = know [how],  have the necessary skills
22. Centr [Lat. centrum ‘center’] =‘the center/culmination of L’
Syntactically, Centr(L) is a noun that takes the name of L as its DSyntA II: Centr−II→L, etc.
 Centr(forest) = the thick [of the ~]
 Centr(crisis) =  the height [of the ~]
 Centr(glory) = summit [of ~]
 Centr(life) = prime [of ~]
23. Magn [Lat. magnus ‘big, great’] = ‘very’, ‘to a (very) high degree’, ‘intense(ly)’:
 Magn(naked) = stark
 Magn(laughV) = heartily; one’s head off	
 Magn(patience) = infinite
 Magn(skinny [person]) = as a rake
24. Ver [Lat. verus ‘real, genuine’] = ‘as it should be’, ‘meeting intended requirements’:
 Ver(surprise) = sincere, genuine, unfeigned
 Ver(punishment) = well-deserved, just
 Ver(instrument) = precise
 Ver(walkV) = steadily
25. Bon [Lat. bonus ‘good’] = ‘good’:
 Bon(cutV) =  neatly, cleanly
 Bon(proposal) =  tempting
 Bon(service) = first-class
 Bon(assistance) =  invaluable
26. Locin [Lat. locus ‘place’] = preposition governing L and designating a containing spatial location (‘being in’):
 Locin(height) = at [a height of ...]
27. Locad [Lat. locus ‘place’] = preposition governing L and designating an entering spatial relation (‘moving into’):
 Locad(height) = to [a height of ...]
28. Locab [Lat. locus ‘place’] = preposition governing L and designating an exiting spatial relation (‘moving out of’):
 Locab(height) = from [a height of ...]
29. Instr [Lat. instrumentum ‘instrument’] = preposition meaning ‘by means of L’:
 Instr(typewriter) = on [ART ~]
 Instr(satellite) = via [~]
 Instr(mail) = by [~]
 Instr(argument) = with [ART ~]
30. Propt [Lat. propter ‘because of’] = preposition meaning ‘because of’/‘as a result of L’: 
 Propt(fear) = from, out of [~]
 Propt(love) = out of [one’s ~ of ...]
31. Operi [Lat. operāri ‘[to] do, carry out’] = a light verb used as part of the expression ‘realize/carry out L':
The DSyntA I of this verb (and its Subject) is the expression that is described in the Government Pattern of L as the i-th DSyntA of L, and Operi’s DSyntA II (= its Primary Object) is L itself.
 Oper1(blowN) = [to] deal [ART ~ to N]
 Oper1(supportN) = [to]  lend [~ to N]
 Oper2(blowN) = [to] receive [ART ~ from N]
 Oper2(supportN) = [to] receive [~ from N] 
32. Funci [Lat. functionāre ‘[to] function’]: 
The DSyntA I of this verb (and its Subject) is L itself, and its DSyntA II (its Primary Object) is the i-th DSyntA of L.
 Func1(blowN) = comes [from N]
 Func2(blowN) = falls [upon N]
If Funci has no object, the subscript 0 is used:
 Func0(snowN) = falls
 Func0(option) = is open	
 Func0(preparations) = are under way
 Func0(rumors) = circulate
33. Laborij [Lat. labōrāre ‘[to] work, toil’]: 
The DSynt-actant I of this verb (and its Subject) is the i-th DSyntA of L, its DSyntA II (its Primary Object) is the j-th DSyntA of L, its DSyntA III (= its Secondary Object) is the j+1-st DSyntA of L, and its further DSyntA (its TertiaryObject) is L itself.
 Labor12(interrogation) =  [to] subject [N to an ~]
 Labor32(leaseN) =  [to] grant [N to N on ~]
34. Incep [Lat. incipere] = ‘begin’:
 Incep(sleep) = fall asleep
35. Cont [Lat. continuāre] = ‘continue’:
 Cont(sleep) = stay asleep
36. Fin [Lat. fīnīre] =  ‘cease’:
 Fin(sleep) = wake up
37. Caus [Lat. causāre]  ‘cause’ [≈ ‘do something so that a situation occurs’]
38. Perm [Lat. permittere] =‘permit/allow’ [≈ ‘do nothing which would cause that a situation does not occur]’
39. Liqu [Lat. *liquidāre] = ‘liquidate’ [≈ ‘do something so that a situation does not occur’]
40. Reali [Lat. realis ‘real’]
 Real1(accusation) = [to] prove [ART ~] 
 Real1(car) = [to] drive [ART ~ ]
 Real1(illness) = [to] succumb [to  ART ~]
 Real2(law) = [to] abide [by ART ~]
 Real2(hintN) = [to] take [ART ~]
 Real2(demandN) = [to] meet [ART ~]
41. Fact0/i [Lat. factum ‘fact’]

42. Labrealijk [a hybrid of Labor and Real] 

43. Involv [Lat. involvere ‘[to] drag along’] = verb meaning ‘[to] involve Y’, ‘[to] affect Y’
Involv links L and the name of a non-participant Y which is affected or acted upon by the situation ‘L’; Y is DSyntA II of Involv, and L  is its DSyntA I:
 Involv(lightN) = floods [N = Y, e.g. the room]
 Involv(snowstorm) = catches [Nhum=Y Locin N], hits [Narea= Y]
44. Manif [Lat. manifestāre ‘[to] manifest’] = verb meaning ‘L manifests itself [≈ becomes apparent] in Y’
The keyword L, a noun, is DSyntA I of Manif, and Y (= in which L manifests itself) is its DSyntA II:
 Manif(doubt) = nags
 Manif(joy) = lights up [his eyes]
45. Degrad [Lat. degradāre ‘[to] degrade’] = verb meaning ‘[to] degrade’ ≈ ‘[to] become permanently worse or bad’. 
Degrad takes its keyword L, which can be any noun, as its DSyntA I.
 Degrad(milk) = goes sour
 Degrad(meat) = goes off	
 Degrad(discipline) = weakens
 Degrad(house) = becomes dilapidated
46. Son [Lat. sonāre ‘[to] sound’] = verb meaning ‘[to] emit characteristic sound’. 
Son also takes its keyword, which most often, but not necessarily, is a concrete noun, as its DSyntA I.
 Son(dog) = barks
 Son(battle) = rumbles
 Son(banknotes) = rustle
 Son(wind) = howls

Complex LFs and Configurations of LFs
Simple LFs can be combined to form complex LFs:
 AntiMagn(applause) = scattered
 IncepOper1(loveN) = [to]  fall [in ~]
 Adv1Real1(whim) = on [a ~]
Certain expressions (collocations or derivations) can simultaneously realize two LFs, resulting in a configuration of LFs:
 [Magn + Oper1](doubt) = [to] be plagued [by ~] (≈ ‘[to] have [= Oper1] strong [= Magn] doubts’)
 [Ver + Oper1](health) = [to] have a clean bill [of ~] (≈ ‘[to] have [= Oper1] good [= Ver] health’)

LFs in the lexicon
Lexical Functions play an important part in the lexicon, which of necessity must include information about the collocational and derivational properties of LUs. In MTT, the LFs for L are included in the entry for L in the Explanatory Combinatorial Dictionary:

REVULSION
Definition
X’s revulsion for Y ≡ ‘X’s (strong) negative feeling about Y caused by X’s perception of Y, similar to what people normally experience when they perceive something that makes them sick and such that it causes that X wants to stop perceiving Y’.

Government Pattern

1) CII.2 : N denotes something that can be seen or felt
2) CII.4 : N denotes people
[‘C’ stands for ‘column;’ the Roman numeral identifies the column, and the Arabic numeral, the cell in it.]
John’s 〈his〉 revulsion against racism 〈against dismal results of his endeavors〉. John’s 〈his〉 revulsion at the sight of sea food; John’s 〈his〉 revulsion for work 〈for all those killings〉; John’s 〈his〉 revulsion for 〈= toward〉 these scoundrels 〈toward the government〉
Impossible:
John’s 〈his〉 revulsion *at these words [correct expression: ... for these words] [by Constraint 1]
John’s 〈his〉  revulsion *towards these words [by Constraint 2]

Lexical Functions

Examples
He did it from deep revulsion for the bitterness of the sectarian strife. Any revulsion they might feel from fat-ass bastards they ran up against professionally was ad hominem and not ad genus [A. Lurie]. Mary turned her head away in revulsion. I felt no revulsion for her maternal fantasies, only a practical concern. She met his advances with revulsion.  Pam was driven to revulsion (by the sight of the dead animal) 〈*The sight of the dead animal drove Pam to revulsion〉. Revulsion at slaughter cut war short [newspaper heading].

Notes

References

External links
 A dictionary of Spanish verb-noun lexical functions
 Lexical systems

Lexicography
Semantics
Meaning–text theory